The Utica, Clinton and Binghamton Railroad was a railroad in the state of New York.  It was leased by the New York and Oswego Midland Railroad as a branch line in connection with the Rome and Clinton Railroad.  After a few years under the Delaware and Hudson Company, it returned to the New York, Ontario and Western Railway system in 1886 and was known by its nickname, "The Peanut". It was later abandoned in 1942.

Defunct New York (state) railroads
Predecessors of the New York, Ontario and Western Railway
Railway companies established in 1868
Railway companies disestablished in 1942
American companies disestablished in 1942
American companies established in 1868